Xanthomonas translucens is a species of phytopathogenic bacteria. It is the causal agent of bacterial leaf streak in of wheat and cereal crop. The bacterium is transmitted as a seed-borne pathogen. The transmission rate is very low but ensures serious outbreaks in the field under suitable conditions.
The pathogen is a non-sporing, aerobic, motile, gram-negative, rod bacterium with a single polar flagellum.

Subspecies 
 (syn. X. campestris pv. translucens) causes a bacterial leaf streak of wheat.  is developed and presented in Schaad & Forster 1985. Xts medium is semi-selective for Xtt. Although some problems with this agar are known, nothing better is available.

References

External links 
Type strain of Xanthomonas translucens at BacDive -  the Bacterial Diversity Metadatabase

Xanthomonadales
Bacteria described in 1917